[[File:2022UQ1-lucy-flyby.png|320px|thumb|Flyby trajectories of the Lucy spacecraft compared to ]]''' was a minor planet provisional designation that was mistakenly given to the Lucy mission's Centaur upper stage booster during its Earth gravity assist flyby in October 2022.

Because the object approached Earth from the direction of the Sun, it was not discovered until after its closest approach. The object was discovered on 18 October 2022 by one of the Asteroid Terrestrial-impact Last Alert System (ATLAS) telescopes in Rio Hurtado, Chile, which reported it to the Minor Planet Center (MPC) as a near-Earth object candidate. Three other observatories produced follow-up observations on the following day and confirmed the object was on a near-Earth orbit, prompting the MPC to announce the object as a new near-Earth object with the provisional designation  on 19 October 2022. The object was later identified as the Lucy'' mission's Centaur upper stage booster by Bill Gray and Davide Farnocchia, resulting in the MPC deleting  from its database on 20 October 2022.

Orbit 

 came to perihelion (closest approach to the Sun) on 27 July 2022 at a distance of 0.84 AU, between the orbits of Venus and Earth. The Earth encounter in October reduced the period of its heliocentric orbit from 1 year to about 241 days and reduced its perihelion to 0.52 AU, placing it in between the orbits of Mercury and Venus.

See also 
 2010 KQ
 2020 SO

Notes

References

External links 
 Lucy rocket booster trajectory (Tony Dunn)
 Closest Asteroid Flyby in 2022 Was Really Space Junk From NASA Mission cnet.com, Oct 20, 2022
 Asteroid (NEO) 2022 UQ1
 
 

Minor planet object articles (unnumbered)
Discoveries by ATLAS
20221018
20221016
Space debris
2022 in space